Deon André Fourie (born 25 September 1986) is a South African rugby union footballer who plays for Western Province in the South African Provincial Currie Cup competition. His regular playing positions are Hooker and Loose forward. 

Fourie previously played for the Western Province provincial team and the Stormers Super Rugby team. Fourie captained Western Province to Currie Cup champions in 2012. He represented South Africa at 7s level internationally in 2007.

In April 2013, Fourie signed a deal that will keep him in Cape Town until 2015. However, he gained an early release from the contract to join French Top 14 side  prior to the 2014–15 Top 14 season.

References

External links
 
Stormers profile
WP rugby profile

1986 births
Living people
South African rugby union players
Stormers players
Western Province (rugby union) players
Rugby union hookers
Rugby union flankers
Afrikaner people
Rugby union players from Pretoria
South Africa international rugby sevens players
South African expatriate rugby union players
Expatriate rugby union players in France
South African expatriate sportspeople in France
Lyon OU players
FC Grenoble players
South Africa international rugby union players